Carmen: A Hip Hopera is a 2001 American musical romantic drama television film produced by MTV and directed by Robert Townsend. The film stars Beyoncé Knowles in her debut acting role (predating her theatrical film debut in Austin Powers in Goldmember), Mekhi Phifer, Mos Def, Rah Digga, Wyclef Jean, Da Brat, Joy Bryant, Reagan Gomez-Preston (who had previously work with Townsend on The Parent 'Hood, which ended in 1999), Jermaine Dupri and Lil' Bow Wow. It is based upon the 1875 opera Carmen by Georges Bizet, Ludovic Halévy and Henri Meilhac. The film is set in Philadelphia and Los Angeles in modern times and features a mostly original hip-hop/R&B score in place of Bizet's opera.

The film is the second major African-American adaptation of the opera, the first being the 1943 Broadway musical Carmen Jones and its 1954 Academy Award-nominated film adaptation.

Plot 
Carmen Brown is a seductive, aspiring actress who unwittingly causes trouble wherever she goes. She gets involved with Sgt. Derek Hill, who is engaged to the cocktail waitress, Caela. At Lou's Bar, Carmen gets into a fight with a jealous woman. Hill's superior officer, Lt. Frank Miller orders Hill to bring Carmen to jail. Carmen tries unsuccessfully to seduce Hill, but she convinces him to let her stop at her apartment to put her mother's ring in a safe place so it does not get stolen in jail. There, she puts on lingerie and wins him over. He is caught in the morning (with Carmen nowhere to be found) by Miller (who is now revealed to be a crooked cop), who brings Caela with him as he arrests Hill. Caela slaps Hill and tells him she hates him.

While in jail, Hill cannot stop thinking about Carmen. She writes him a letter, and he shares his obsession with cellmates Jalil and "Pockets". While Hill is in jail, Carmen meets the famous rapper Blaze at "the Spot", a nightclub. He wants to bring her to Los Angeles, but succeeds only in bringing her best friends. Carmen promises to meet them in LA once Hill is out of jail. Unfortunately, Hill is facing a year of probation once he gets out. However, after he gets into an argument with Miller, he punches him. He and Carmen flee to Los Angeles. However, Carmen is unaware of the incident.

Things in Los Angeles do not go well: Carmen cannot find an acting job, and Hill's fugitive status prevents him from obtaining employment. She runs into her best friends, Rasheeda and Nikki , who are being treated like royalty by Blaze. The three of them have their tarot cards read by a psychic (Wyclef Jean). Rasheeda and Nikki receive favorable fortunes, but Carmen's cards read "ruin," "sorrow" and "death." She decides that it is time for a change. She goes to Blaze's rehearsal and wins an invitation to be his date to his next concert. Meanwhile, Miller is looking for Hill, and Porter (his ex-partner) gives him Hill and Carmen's address for a large amount of cash. At the same time, a radio, connected to a power point, falls into the bathtub which Carmen had just left. Carmen wonders if that was meant to be her death.

Shortly afterwards, Carmen breaks up with Hill and moves in with her friends in a house apparently owned by Blaze. She feels that she should not give up her life for him, even though he did for her. Much like his counterpart in the original opera, Hill is devastated. He also learns from Caela that he is in danger. Since Hill knows how crooked he is, Miller wants to get rid of him. Hill goes to Carmen to try to win her over again and make her leave with him. Carmen does not want to leave and tells Hill that she is staying. While they are arguing, Miller is watching them and accidentally shoots Carmen twice with a silenced gun while aiming for Hill. Carmen dies in Hill's arms and she can't talk when Hill keeps asking what was wrong. He touches her back and sees blood running down his hand. He lays the dead body down on the floor and goes to fight Miller. Hill and Miller have their last fight which ends with Miller falling to his death. Rasheeda and Nikki find Carmen's dead body and are both shocked and devastated. The story ends with Hill's wrongful arrest. The film officially ends with the rapping narrator (Da Brat) laying a rose down for Carmen stating "Immortal Beloved ... Carmen Brown, There'll never be another".

Cast

History 
Carmen: A Hip Hopera is a remake that mostly resembles the 1954 version starring Dorothy Dandridge and Harry Belafonte titled Carmen Jones. The 1954 remake was of the opera by Georges Bizet titled Carmen. The film has a potential halt as it exercised a common role for African-American women known as "Jezebel typecast". 

The Hip Hopera version was directed by Robert Townsend who also directed The Meteor Man and Eddie Murphy Raw and starred in the musical The Five Heartbeats in 1991. The Hip Hopera film was produced by MTV in 2001. There are some discrepancies with how the story is made different from its original play version as well as criticism of Beyoncé's movie debut performance. In the book Carmen: From Silent Film to MTV, Perriam and Davies state that "Beyoncé ... is an accomplished, virtuoso singer, and she has difficulty bending her particular talents to spoken delivery". The opposite was said about Mehki Phifer who "has proven himself elsewhere an effective actor for television and film, but he seems to be uncomfortable here either rapping or singing".

Critical response 
The film received mainly mixed reviews. AllMovie graded it with two-and-a-half out of five stars.

References

External links 
 
 

2001 television films
2001 films
2001 romantic drama films
2000s American films
2000s English-language films
2000s hip hop films
2000s musical drama films
2000s romantic musical films
African-American musical drama films
African-American romance films
American drama television films
American musical drama films
American romantic drama films
American romantic musical films
Films about actors
Films based on Carmen
Films directed by Robert Townsend
Films set in Los Angeles
Films set in Philadelphia
Films shot in Los Angeles
Georges Bizet
MTV original films
Musical television films
Rap operas
Romance television films